Marc Bator (born December 4, 1972) is a German television moderator.

Life 
Bator was born in Hannover. From 2001 to 2013 he worked for the German news magazine Tagesschau broadcast by ARD. Since 2013 he worked for Sat.1 Nachrichten on German broadcaster Sat.1. Bator is married and has two children.

External links 
 Offizielle Website von Marc Bator

References 

German television presenters
German broadcast news analysts
1972 births
Living people
People from Hanover
Tagesschau (ARD) presenters and reporters
ARD (broadcaster) people
Sat.1 people
Television people from Lower Saxony